Moshi Monsters: The Movie is a 2013 animated film directed by Wip Vernooij and co-directed by Morgan Francis. It is based on the virtual world video game of Moshi Monsters. The film features the voices of Emma Tate, Tom Clarke Hill, Phillipa Alexander, and Keith Wickham. The film was released to UK and Irish cinemas on 20 December 2013 and grossed $2.9 million.

Although the film did not receive a theatrical release in North America, it has been broadcast on Starz in May 2019, and was available on Hulu and Sling TV.

Plot

The film takes place in Monstro City, a peaceful island in the ocean. Monsters Poppet, Katsuma, and Mr. Snoodle are at home. Katsuma starts talking about starring in Roary Scrawl's documentary about Monstro City. The trio goes into town to meet him. In Monstro City, a strange-looking Flumpy escapes with Fifi through the sewers. Poppet, Katsuma, and Mr. Snoodle enter the diner. Roary Scrawl introduces them to Zommer, Furi, Luvli, and Diavlo. He says he wants them all to star in his movie, which angers fame-hungry Katsuma. The news reports the missing Moshling epidemic and says that arch-criminals Dr. Strangeglove and Sweet Tooth are still on the loose. The news cuts to Buster Bumblechops (who broke his leg during his adventures) talking about a mysterious Great Moshling Egg, which is now on display at his museum. Poppet thinks the egg is an addition to the movie, so they go to visit Buster. Dr. Strangeglove is seen spying in the sewers with the strange Flumpy, who turns out to be his sidekick Fishlips. Fifi is put in the Glumping machine. Dr. Strangeglove and Fishlips steal the egg. Later, the six Moshi Monsters, Blinki, and Roary arrive at the museum. Buster wants to show them the egg only to find it's not there. They find out that the egg was replaced by a Glump. In its place is a holographic kit left by Dr. Strangeglove, ordering them to find three items by midnight - fried Oobla Doobla, a Blue Jeeper's tears, and Frosted Rainbow Rox, which together will make the component to hatch the egg.
 
The monsters decide to go on a quest to retrieve the three artifacts, get the egg and defeat Dr. Strangeglove. The first stop they went to is Gombala Gombala Jungle. The Oobla Doobla is in the Wooly Blue Hoodoo Village [that can communicate whistles]. Poppet and Zommer went separate ways, but Katsuma and the others got captured. Poppet and Zommer soon found them. The Wooly Blue Hoodoos challenge them to a game of limbo. Poppet fails but Zommer wins by using his body parts. The monsters end up getting the first artifact.

During the path, the monsters fall into a trap and an underground candy cave and get stuck in hard candy. Sweet Tooth is revealed to be the one who tricked them. While they were distracted Diavlo melts the candy and gets everyone into the carts and they all flee from Sweet Tooth. Diavlo and Luvli escape but they get captured by Dr. Strangeglove, who then kidnaps Zommer. Later, Katsuma, Poppet, Mr. Snoodle, and Furi get to Jollywood. They soon meet Bobbi SingSong. Poppet spies a Blue Jeeper, who likes music and are rare, and tries to catch it. Katsuma falls in an accident, causing the keeper to laugh cry, and Poppet catches the tears by using the bottle. Now that Poppet and Katsuma have two artifacts, they try to get help searching for the last piece, but Furi wanders off (as he is captured) and Katsuma, Poppet and Mr. Snoodle are teleported to Mount Sillimanjaro after being distracted during Bobbi Singsong's kerfuffle.

Poppet and Katsuma begin to climb up Mount Sillimanjaro, but Katsuma and Poppet have an argument and Katsuma shouts, causing an avalanche to begin. Before the three monsters can get buried in snow, Katsuma pulls Poppet and Mr. Snoodle into a cave. The snow covers the entrance up. Katsuma says it was all his fault because he ruined everything and caused awful things to happen. Poppet cheers him up by singing the song We Can Do It and they manage to find the Frosted Rainbow Rox. Katsuma, Poppet and Mr. Snoodle go to a wooden hut where Dr. Strangeglove stands in front of them. Soon, they fight over the egg, and Strangeglove escapes but Mr. Snoodle attacks him. Dr. Strangeglove asks Mr. Snoodle if he remembered when deep down he was a good guy. But before Mr. Snoodle can reply, Dr. Strangeglove says that he lied and pushes Mr. Snoodle out of the hut and he falls to his death. Poppet mourns over him and now Katsuma and Poppet are captured.

In Strangeglove's ship, the monsters are now in a cage ready to be killed while Dr. Strangeglove and Fishlips take the ingredients to the egg. Suddenly, Poppet hears a noise and it is revealed that Mr. Snoodle survived the fall. He explains through his trumpeting that he survived by whistling. He landed safely in a balloon and flew back down to the Moshis. Katsuma doesn't know how to open the lock, because he can't whistle but only blows raspberries, but Mr. Snoodle can.  They all free the Moshlings and attack the Glumps, defeating Dr. Strangeglove.

When they return to Monstro City, the Moshi Monsters bring the Great Moshling Egg back to the museum, just before it hatches. The creature is revealed to be a Mrs. Snoodle, and Katsuma whistles for the first time. Deep in the jungle, there are more rare eggs waiting to be hatched in the temple at the beginning of the movie. During the first part of the credits, Mr. Snoodle and Mrs. Snoodle do the Snoodle Doodle, and then pictures showing the aftermath of the film are shown on the left side of the screen while an instrumental of We Can Do It plays.

Cast 
Emma Tate as Katsuma and Luvli
 Phillipa Alexander as Poppet
 Ashley Slater as Dr. Strangeglove and Zommer
 Boris Hiestand as Fishlips and Newsreader
 Tom Clarke Hill as Furi and Roary
 Keith Wickham as Buster Bumblechops and Diavlo
 Rajesh David as Bobbi SingSong
 Steve Cleverley as Sweet Tooth.

Production 
The film was produced by Mind Candy and Cornwall-based animation studio Spider Eye Productions.
It was financed and produced entirely in the UK.

Reception 
The film received positive reviews from critics.

Helen O'Hara of Empire magazine wrote: "For the very young, the surreal, sweet-toothed pleasures will be captivating. For the older audience member, it may be the longest 81 minutes they've ever spent." Tim Robey of The Telegraph gave it 3 out of 5 and wrote: "The film was lulling and sweetly harmless; the franchise's 80 million global subscribers can't all be wrong."
Peter Bradshaw of The Guardian wrote that "even fans of the online game Moshi Monsters may find the film version an incredibly annoying and baffling bore." Mark Kermode gave the film 1 star, believing it may entertain very young children, but "will leave adults bored, stupefied, revolted and appalled".

Guy Lodge of Variety wrote: "Moshi Monsters: The Movie welcomes new converts with an effective combination of seizure-inducing color and insidiously catchy songs." He called the voicework "adequate" and called the songs a welcome distraction.

Home media 
Moshi Monsters: The Movie was released on DVD on Monday 14 April 2014 in the UK. It comes with either a Jackson or Mrs Snoodle trading card and a Mrs Snoodle code for online and the Moshi Village app.

See also
 List of films based on video games

References

External links
 
 

2013 films
2013 animated films
British animated films
British children's films
American flash animated films
Animated films based on video games
Animated musical films
Universal Pictures films
Universal Pictures animated films
2010s children's films
2010s English-language films
2010s American films
2010s British films